Mark Risley is an American writer, animator, storyboard artist, producer and director specializing in children's television. He is best-known for his work on Rugrats, The Wild Thornberrys, The Mr. Men Show, Space Racers, and Yo-kai Watch.

Career
Risley began his career as an animator on several television programs including Attack of the Killer Tomatoes, Gladiators 2000 and the CBS Prime-time special The Magic Paintbrush. Later he worked in the story department on the Kids' Choice Awards winning film The Rugrats Movie, then moved on to produce and direct Rugrats, The Wild Thornberrys (1998), Rocket Power (1999), and As Told by Ginger (2000–2004) for Nickelodeon and Klasky Csupo.

After directing selected sequences of the theatrical feature, The Wild Thornberrys Movie (2002) Risley went to DreamWorks Animation where he directed Father of the Pride for NBC television.

His credits also include Nickelodeon's Tak & the Power of Juju, Cartoon Network's The Mr. Men Show, Disney's Pixie Hollow Games, NFL Rush Zone, PBS Kids' Space Racers (which won the 2015 American Public Television award for Excellence in Broadcasting) and the anime television series Yo-kai Watch.

He is currently directing the film Fairest of Them All for Rokit Pictures.

Awards and nominations
Daytime Emmy Awards
 2001, The Wild Thornberrys, "Outstanding Children's Animated Program"
 2003, Rugrats, "Outstanding Children's Animated Program"

Emmy Awards
 2001, As Told by Ginger, "Outstanding Animated Program (For Programming Less Than One Hour)"
 2002, As Told by Ginger, "Outstanding Animated Program (For Programming Less Than One Hour)"
 2003, As Told by Ginger, "Outstanding Animated Program (For Programming Less Than One Hour)"

American Public Television Award
2014 "Space Racers", "Excellence in Broadcasting"

People's Choice Awards
2005, Father of the Pride, Favorite New TV Comedy Program

Genesis Awards
 2000, "The Wild Thornberrys, "Outstanding Children's Program (animated)"

Annecy Awards
 2002 As Told by Ginger episode And She Was Gone, "Outstanding Direction (For Programming Less Than One Hour)" 

Banff Rockie Awards
 2001 As Told by Ginger episode "Hello Stranger", "Best Animation Program"

American Public Television Excellence in Broadcasting
2014, Space Racers, Best New Preschool Program

Cynopsis Award
2015, Space Racers, Best New Animated Preschool Program

References

External links 
 
 The Mr. Men Show
 Space Racers
 Mark Risley's website

Interviews
 Culture Shock interview
Mr. Men Show Blog interview
Tribune News Service Interview (link dead as of 2009-01-15)

American television writers
American male television writers
Living people
American animators
American animated film producers
American animated film directors
American storyboard artists
Television producers from California
American television directors
American casting directors
American voice directors
Nickelodeon Animation Studio people
Writers from San Diego
Screenwriters from California
Year of birth missing (living people)